La barra de Taponazo is a 1932  Argentine film directed by Alejandro del Conte.

Cast
Vicente Padula
Emé Doris
Carmen Reyes
Paco Obregón
Roberto Saghini
Julio de Caro
Miguel Gómez Bao
Julio Andrada

References

External links
 

1932 films
1930s Spanish-language films
Argentine black-and-white films
Argentine comedy-drama films
1932 comedy-drama films
1930s Argentine films